David Fletcher Miller (born October 12, 1952) is an American musician, multi-instrumentalist, record producer, singer, and songwriter. Since 1989, Dave Miller has resided in Memphis, Tennessee.

History
Dave Miller has been playing music, performing, and writing songs for 5 decades (1964–
present). He has played in taverns, dance halls, concert venues, festivals, showcases, and
coffee houses from coast to coast across the United States and in British Columbia.

Notably, Dave and some of his friends formed a bluegrass trio that played around his hometown
of Little Rock, Arkansas, and subsequently moved to Santa Fe, New Mexico, in 1976. The
influences of the swing and two-stepping dance crowds and the great bands of the area that
packed the dance floors, left a lasting impression on him. By 1977, keeping their homespun
bluegrass and hillbilly roots, but adding swing, country rock, and western flavored ballads to
their sound, they had named the band Gumbo because of the spicy mixture of so many types of
music and instrumental combinations that the band had come to offer.

Throughout their tenure (1977–1982), Gumbo was a popular circuit band in Arkansas, Colorado,
New Mexico, and Texas, but played venues from Myrtle Beach, South Carolina, to Fort Nelson, British Columbia, and all points in between, drawing big, enthusiastic crowds wherever they
performed—even as the opening act for such performers as Brenda Lee, Jerry Jeff Walker, and
Michael Martin Murphey.

In late 1978, the members of Gumbo moved to Alamosa, Colorado, and became a foundational
piece of the vibrant and unique music scene that is still playing, creating, and recording a unique
brand of Americana music in Colorado and Northern New Mexico. It was there that Dave
Miller met Don Richmond, a fellow picker, writer, and performer who is now the Owner and
Producer for Howlin' Dog Records, where Dave has recorded much of his original music.

In 2013, after taking a long break from the road, enjoying family life, and having a successful
career designing and developing medical products, Dave returned to his roots in performing,
songwriting, and entered the world of recording.

In late 2016, Dave and his cousin Frank Cox decided to form Rocktown Revival as a way to
deliver Dave's original music as well as songs from some of the greatest American artists to
folks who, like themselves, love the revival of roots-based music. In addition to Dave Miller,
Rocktown Revival includes veterans Frank Cox on guitar, Leslie McBryde on vocals, Bill
Thurman on fiddle, Bill McCumber on bass, and B.J. Davis on drums. Their 40+ year careers,
much of it playing together, have included forays into the roots of country and folk rock,
foundational Americana, driving banjo-fueled bluegrass, as well as blues and rockabilly—with
some jazz even thrown in for good measure.

Influences
Dave Miller began playing music at age 13 when his mother bought him a five-string banjo for
Christmas the year his father passed away. He would tune it up and play along with the country
and bluegrass stars who performed on the Saturday afternoon music shows. He sometimes jokes
that it was the great Earl Scruggs himself who taught Dave to play the banjo—Dave sitting on
his sofa in Little Rock, Earl in the television studio in Nashville. Dave joined his first band,
The 49ers, shortly thereafter in 1964 at the age of 14. Over time, Levon Helm, Merle Haggard,
Delbert McClinton, Guy Clark, and John Prine all came to influence him.

Current activity
In November 2016, in collaboration with, and as a tribute to, his Gumbo bandmate Pat Hooper,
Dave Miller released his first album, titled Just Flow: The Tribute Sessions. The recording of
this album was started in Memphis, Tennessee, at Easley McCain Recording in 2013 and finished at
Howlin' Dog Studios in Alamosa, Colorado, in 2016.

Subsequently, in December 2017, Dave released an album of 12 of his original songs, titled
Southern Dreams, which was also recorded at Howlin' Dog Records. As Dave Miller recounts
in the liner notes for the album:

"We all have dreams. When we close our eyes to think about the future, sing a
heartfelt song, kiss someone we love, drift into sleep, or pray for grace, we come face
to face with our dreams. They give us a reason to hope, to work, to persevere, and to
celebrate. We can travel through a dream world full of faces from the past,
experiences we have imagined, magical landscapes, and flights through time.
Sometimes we work and hope and nothing happens, and it hurts. Sometimes we get
to live our dreams or something beyond even our wildest dreams. The songs you will
find here are flavored with the spices, woven with the textures, and animated with the
images that remind me of growing up, working, traveling, living, singing, and
dreaming in the South and Southwest regions of our beautiful country. I hope these
tunes take you down a path through some of your own dreams and experiences, make
you tap your toes, grin a little bit, and sing along."

In October 2019, Dave Miller released another album featuring 12 of his original songs, titled 
Beauty Path.  His first release to appear on the Howlin' Dog Records label, Beauty Path was 
recorded and engineered by Don Richmond at Howlin' Dog Studios in Alamosa, Colorado. The 
album was produced by both Don Richmond and Dave Miller.

Nowadays, you can catch Dave playing around Memphis as part of the duo Mulberry Branch,
along with fiddler Bill Thurman, or playing all over the Mid-South fronting Rocktown Revival,
the six-piece band that Dave formed along with his cousin Frank Cox in late 2016 as a way to
deliver Dave's original music as well as to perform songs from some of the greatest American
artists for folks who, like themselves, love the revival of roots-based music.

Collaborations
In November 2016, in collaboration with, and as a tribute to, his Gumbo bandmate Pat Hooper,
Dave Miller released his first album, titled Just Flow: The Tribute Sessions. Recording for this
album was started in Memphis, Tennessee, at Easley McCain Recording and finished at Howlin'
Dog Studios in Alamosa, Colorado.

From late 2013 to early 2014, Dave and his long-time picking pal, Pat Hooper, decided to take
some of their original tunes into the studio and create a record that reflected the joy they always
found in playing and singing together. They began working with Davis McCain at Easley-
McCain Studios, where they succeeded at capturing the rhythm, bass, and lead vocal tracks for
the songs. Then tragically, on April 2, 2014, Pat passed away. As Dave Miller recounts in
the liner notes for the album:

"Pat and I played together for about 30 years, off and on, touring together in the
hillbilly rock fusion band, Gumbo, in the late '70s and early '80s. Pat performed
his entire adult life in countless combos, touring back-up bands, and traveling
family shows, and played in venues across the U.S. and Canada. His sudden
death broke the heart of the community that loved him so much. It also meant the
tracks lay untouched for 2 years and the future of the project looked uncertain at
best. Musician friends that I spoke to encouraged me to finish the project and
offered their help—Gumbo bandmates, players who had traveled the same
circuits, Pat's friends. Without exception, these are premier players and singers
that have decades of experience on stage and in the studio and who wanted to be a
part of finishing what Pat and I had started."

Recording for the album was completed at Howlin' Dog Studios in late 2016.

Discography

Just Flow: The Tribute Sessions (November 2016) 
 The Walk (Pat Hooper) 4:28
 Café Afternoon (Dave Miller) 4:26
 Pistol And Bible (Dave Miller) 4:31
 Baby Loves The Wind (Dave Miller) 3:13
 Reggae Heart (Dave Miller) 3:01
 My Everything (Dave Miller) 3:04
 Play Lily Play (Dave Miller) 5:23
 Sailor's Rest (Dave Miller, Sterling Smith) 4:39
 The Miner (Pat Hooper) 4:40
 Just Flow (Dave Miller) 4:10

Just Flow: The Tribute Sessions is the first studio album by American singer-songwriter Dave
Miller. An independent release, the album was recorded at Howlin' Dog Studios in Alamosa,
Colorado, and Easley-McCain Studios in Memphis, Tennessee. Don Richmond, Dave Miller,
and Davis McCain engineered Just Flow: The Tribute Sessions, and Don Richmond and Dave
Miller produced the album.

Southern Dreams (December 2017)
 Big Boy, Big Breakfast (Dave Miller) 3:26
 Cowboy's Last Show (Dave Miller) 5:15
 Right Wrong Turn (Dave Miller) 3:36
 Counting On Love (Dave Miller) 4:10
 Rollin' Off A Log (Dave Miller) 2:41
 Too Far Gone (Dave Miller) 4:02
 Shiny Shoes (Dave Miller) 4:13
 I Miss Yesterday (Dave Miller) 4:38
 She's So Gone (Dave Miller) 3:33
 Love Light (Dave Miller) 4:45
 The Hat (Dave Miller) 5:33
 Dry Spell (Dave Miller) 4:50

Southern Dreams is the second studio album by American singer-songwriter Dave Miller. The
album features 12 of Dave's original songs. An independent release, Southern Dreams was
recorded and engineered by Don Richmond at Howlin' Dog Studios in Alamosa, Colorado. The
album was produced by Don Richmond and Dave Miller.

Beauty Path (October 2019)
Long Road Home (Dave Miller) 4:12
 I Will (Dave Miller) 4:16
 Beauty Path (Dave Miller) 5:11
 Uncle Levi's Wooden Leg (Dave Miller) 5:10
 Full Life (Dave Miller) 4:15
 Valley Of The Song (Dave Miller) 4:39
 What's In The Gumbo, Mama (Dave Miller) 4:16
 New Boots (Dave Miller) 4:18
 Sunrise In My Heart (Dave Miller) 2:57
 Freeport (Dave Miller) 3:04
 Grandfather Tree (Dave Miller) 4:20
 Heart Like A Wineglass (Dave Miller) 4:06

Beauty Path is the third studio album by American singer-songwriter Dave Miller. The album
features 12 of Dave's original songs. His first release to appear on the Howlin' Dog Records
label, Beauty Path was recorded and engineered by Don Richmond at Howlin' Dog Studios in
Alamosa, Colorado. The album was produced by both Don Richmond and Dave Miller.

References

External links 
 Official website
 Howlin' Dog Records

1952 births
Living people
American male singer-songwriters
American folk guitarists
American male guitarists
People from Memphis, Tennessee
Musicians from Little Rock, Arkansas
Singer-songwriters from Arkansas